You're My Boss is a 2015 Filipino romantic comedy film written and directed by Antoinette Jadaone starring Toni Gonzaga and Coco Martin. It was released on April 4, 2015, by Star Cinema.

Cast
 Toni Gonzaga as Georgina Lorenzana - Assistant Vice President for Marketing Affair
 Coco Martin as Pong Dalupan - Executive Secretary of the Airline Company
 Freddie Webb as Albert Chief - Commercial Officer President
 Gloria Sevilla as Lola - Pong's grandmother
 Adam Chan as Mr. Najimoto - The airline company's investor.
 Noel Trinidad as Lolo - Pong's grandfather
 Pepe Herrera as Tupe - Pong's cousin
 Jerald Napoles as Bojeck - Pong's friend
 Deniese Aguilar as Georgina's Friend
 Via Antonio as Georgina's Friend
 Joan Palisoc as Georgina's Friend
 Angela Cortez as Georgina's Friend
 Jerome Tan as Japanese Entourage
 Yoshihiro Takaga as Japanese Entourage
 Tony Lao as Japanese Entourage
 Gerry Decayco as Mang Berto

Special participation
 JM de Guzman as Gino Andres - Georgina's ex-boyfriend.
 Regine Angeles as Sheila Rivera

Theme song 
 The official theme song of the film is Baby I Need Your Loving performed by Harana.

Box office
The film earned  on its opening day. After three days, the film had earned . It earned  on its sixth day, despite strong competition from Fast and Furious 7.

See also 
 List of Filipino films in 2015

References

External links 
 

2015 films
Philippine romantic comedy films
2015 romantic comedy films
2010s Tagalog-language films
2010s English-language films
Star Cinema films
Films directed by Antoinette Jadaone
2015 multilingual films
Philippine multilingual films